

Hans Degen (18 February 1899 – 8 November 1971) was a general in the Wehrmacht of Nazi Germany. He was a recipient of the Knight's Cross of the Iron Cross.

Life and career
Hans Degen was born in Rosenheim in Upper Bavaria in 1899. He entered the German Army in September 1916 as an ensign, serving in a Jäger battalion until the end of World War I. He remained in the army after 1918, becoming a general staff officer. In this capacity he served with 2nd Mountain Division in 1938, moving to the 1st Mountain Division on the outbreak of war in September 1939. He was then appointed chief of staff of VI Army Corps and then XIX Army Corps.

In November 1943 he took command of the 2nd Mountain Division. This served on the Arctic and Western fronts, where Degen was badly wounded, retiring from the division in February 1945. In March 1945 he was awarded the Knight's Cross of the Iron Cross for his command of the division.

Degen ended the war with the rank of Generalleutnant.

Awards and decorations

 German Cross in Gold
 Knight's Cross of the Iron Cross on 11 March 1945 as Generalleutnant and commander of 2. Gebirgs-Division.

Notes

References

 

 

1899 births
1971 deaths
People from the Kingdom of Bavaria
People from Rosenheim
Lieutenant generals of the German Army (Wehrmacht)
Recipients of the clasp to the Iron Cross, 2nd class
German military personnel of the Spanish Civil War
Recipients of the Order of the Cross of Liberty, 1st Class
Recipients of the Gold German Cross
Recipients of the Knight's Cross of the Iron Cross
German prisoners of war in World War II held by the United States
German Army personnel of World War I
Military personnel from Bavaria
Reichswehr personnel